Prairie County is in the Central Arkansas region of the U.S. state of Arkansas. The county is named for the Grand Prairie, a subregion of the Arkansas Delta known for rice cultivation and aquaculture that runs through the county. Created as Arkansas's 54th county in 1846, Prairie County is home to four incorporated towns, including DeValls Bluff, the southern district county seat, and two incorporated cities, including Des Arc, the northern district county seat. The county is also the site of numerous unincorporated communities and ghost towns. Occupying , Prairie County is the median-sized county in Arkansas. As of the 2020 Census, the county's population was 8,282. Based on population, the county is the ninth-smallest county of the 75 in Arkansas.

The county is crossed by Interstate 40 (I-40), a major east–west Interstate highway running from California to North Carolina, as well as four United States highways (U.S. Route 63 [US 63], US 70, US 79, and US 165). Eleven Arkansas state highways run in the county. Prairie County is served by two public owned/public use general aviation airports and six potable water systems.

History
The county at first was land given to Cherokee Indians resettled from Tennessee and was the Western band of Cherokee reservation from 1812 to 1836. Even today, an estimated 2,000 residents have some American Indian ancestry.

The town of Fredonia (Biscoe) was named for the unsuccessful 1826 attempt of Arkansas Cherokee and to create the Republic of Fredonia by Arkansas Cherokee and Texan settlers in then Mexican Texas. The town of DeValls Bluff was the Western Cherokee's seat, and is now one of Prairie County's seats.

Prairie County suffered greatly during the Civil War. Des Arc was partly destroyed, and a local historian estimated that not more than 15 horses were left in the county by the war's end. The rest had been taken by soldiers of one army or the other.

On September 5, 1913, Lee Simms became the first person to be executed in Arkansas by the electric chair. He was executed for the crime of violent rape.

Stern's Medlar, a previously unknown plant species, was discovered in Prairie County as recently as 1990. It is not known to grow anywhere else in the world. The plant is critically endangered, with only 25 known specimens, all growing within a single small wood, now protected as the Konecny Grove Natural Area.

Geography

The county is located between two primary geographic regions of Arkansas: Central Arkansas and the Arkansas Delta (in Arkansas, usually referred to as "the Delta"). The Arkansas Delta is a subregion of the Mississippi Alluvial Plain, which is a flat area consisting of rich, fertile sediment deposits from the Mississippi River between Louisiana and Illinois. The county is often described as being within the Grand Prairie, a subdivision of the Arkansas Delta known today for rice farming and aquaculture, rather than Central Arkansas or the Delta. It is this geographic feature from which the county derives its name.

Prior to settlement, Prairie County was large, flat grassland distinct from the swamps and bayous in the nearby Delta. Although cotton and other row crops grew well in the Prairie's silty loam soil, rice production changed the cultivation patterns in the county at the turn of the nineteenth century. Although some prairie and riparian areas has been preserved in conservation areas, a large portion (44 percent) of the county remains in cultivation. Another large land use in Prairie County is the Cache River NWR and Wattensaw Wildlife Management Area (WMA), owned by the United States Fish and Wildlife Service and Arkansas Game and Fish Commission, respectively.

Prairie County is surrounded by five other counties: White County to the north, Woodruff County to the northeast, Monroe County to the east, Arkansas County to the south, and Lonoke County to the west.

Climate
Prairie County has a humid subtropical climate (Köppen Cfa). Prairie County experiences all four seasons, although summers can be extremely hot and humid and winters are mild with little snow. Temperatures above  are not uncommon.

Demographics

2020 census

As of the 2020 United States census, there were 8,282 people, 3,776 households, and 2,495 families residing in the county.

2000 census
As of the 2000 United States Census, there were 9,539 people, 3,894 households, and 2,795 families residing in the county.  The population density was 6/km2 (15/mi2).  There were 4,790 housing units at an average density of 3/km2 (7/mi2).  The racial makeup of the county was 84.83% White, 13.71% Black or African American, 0.36% Native American, 0.18% Asian, 0.28% from other races, and 0.64% from two or more races.  0.81% of the population were Hispanic or Latino of any race.

There were 3,894 households, out of which 30.60% had children under the age of 18 living with them, 56.60% were married couples living together, 11.10% had a female householder with no husband present, and 28.20% were non-families. 25.60% of all households were made up of individuals, and 13.20% had someone living alone who was 65 years of age or older.  The average household size was 2.41 and the average family size was 2.88.

In the county, the population was spread out, with 23.90% under the age of 18, 7.50% from 18 to 24, 26.10% from 25 to 44, 25.10% from 45 to 64, and 17.30% who were 65 years of age or older.  The median age was 40 years. For every 100 females there were 97.00 males.  For every 100 females age 18 and over, there were 93.40 males.

The median income for a household in the county was $29,990, and the median income for a family was $36,131. Males had a median income of $28,413 versus $18,808 for females. The per capita income for the county was $15,907.  About 12.20% of families and 15.50% of the population were below the poverty line, including 21.00% of those under age 18 and 16.80% of those age 65 or over.

Economy
The economy of Prairie County is primarily agricultural (25.6%), followed by government employees (14.3%), and professional services (14.3%).

Government

The county government is a constitutional body granted specific powers by the Constitution of Arkansas and the Arkansas Code. The quorum court is the legislative branch of the county government and controls all spending and revenue collection. Representatives are called justices of the peace and are elected from county districts every even-numbered year. The number of districts in a county vary from nine to fifteen, and district boundaries are drawn by the county election commission. The Prairie County Quorum Court has nine members. Presiding over quorum court meetings is the county judge, who serves as the chief operating officer of the county. The county judge is elected at-large and does not vote in quorum court business, although capable of vetoing quorum court decisions.

Politics
Since the late 20th century, the majority-white Prairie County has traditionally supported Republican Party presidential candidates, except when an alternative from another Southern state has been present. The county supported Arkansas Governor Bill Clinton by a wide margin, as well as Georgia Governor Jimmy Carter, Alabama Governor George Wallace (running as an independent), and Texas native Lyndon Johnson. Following Clinton, the county has turned increasingly Republican, supporting Donald Trump 72.7% in 2016.

In Congress, Arkansas has been represented by two Republican senators (John Boozman and Tom Cotton) since January 3, 2015, ending a long history of Democratic hegemony. In the House of Representatives, Prairie County is within the Arkansas 1st district with many other agricultural Delta counties on the eastern side of the state. The Arkansas 1st has been represented by Rick Crawford since 2010.

In the Arkansas Senate, Prairie County is within the 28th District with portions of Arkansas, Lonoke, Monroe, White, and Woodruff counties. The district has been represented by Jonathan Dismang, a Beebe Republican, since January 2013. In the Arkansas House of Representatives, Prairie County is entirely within District 13, which also contains portions of Arkansas, Lonoke, and White counties. District 13 has been represented by David Hillman of Almyra since 2013. Hillman switched to the Republican Party shortly after winning reelection in November 2016.

Communities

Cities
Des Arc (County seat)

DeValls Bluff (County seat)

Towns

Hazen

Fredonia (Biscoe)

Ulm

Unincorporated communities

Barrettsville
Bay Plantation
Beulah
Brasfield
Buck's Landing
Center Point
Childers
Crossroad
Edwards
Erwin
Fairmount
Four Mile Corner
Gospoda
Hallsville
Harrys
Hayley
Hickory Plains
Jasmine
Kay
Letchworth
Little Dixie
Lookout
Mesa
Peppers Lake
Peppers Landing
Plunketts
Sand Hill
Screeton
Siedenstricker
Slovak
Tarnceville
Tollville
Vaby

Historical communities

Balle
Bardill
Beecher
Cuneo
Enarc
Harrys
Hunterton
La Grue
Leighton
Mooresville
Nahay
Slovaktown
Spear
Stineville
Super
Thomas
Uzzett
Veits
Willard
Yuma

Townships

 Belcher
 Bullard
 Calhoun
 Center
 Des Arc
 Hazen (Hazen)
 Hickory Plain
 Lower Surrounded Hill (Fredonia (Biscoe))
 Roc Roe (Ulm)
 Tyler
 Union
 Upper Surrounded Hill
 Watensaw (DeValls Bluff)
 White River (Des Arc)

Infrastructure

Aviation
Prairie County contains two public owned/public use general aviation airports. Both were built during World War II by the United States Army Air Forces, and turned over to local municipalities following the war. Both are predominantly used for agricultural (spraying) operations.

The Hazen Municipal Airport is located west of Hazen along US 70. For the twelve-month period ending April 30, 2014, the facility saw 32,000 general aviation operations. The Stuttgart Municipal Airport is located in southern Prairie County near the Arkansas County line. For the twelve-month period ending July 31, 2014, the facility saw 35,000 general aviation operations, 3,000 military operations, and 2,500 air taxi operations.

Major highways

 Interstate 40
 US Highway 63
 US Highway 70
 US Highway 79
 US Highway 165
 Highway 11
 Highway 13
 Highway 33
 Highway 38
 Highway 86
  Highway 249
  Highway 302
  Highway 323
  Highway 343
  Highway 959
  Highway 980

Utilities

The Arkansas Department of Health is responsible for the regulation and oversight of public water systems throughout the state. Prairie County contains six community water systems: Biscoe Waterworks, Des Arc Waterworks, DeValls Bluff Waterworks, East Prairie County Public Water Authority (PWA), Hazen Waterworks, Southeast [White County] PWA, and Ulm Waterworks. Des Arc Waterworks has the largest retail population (3,882), followed by Hazen (1,600), and East Prairie County PWA (699). All community water systems in Prairie County use groundwater as their source of raw water, except Ulm, which purchases all water from  Grand Prairie Regional Water and the small portion served by Southeast White County PWA.

See also

 List of counties in Arkansas
 List of lakes in Prairie County, Arkansas
 National Register of Historic Places listings in Prairie County, Arkansas

Notes

References

 
1846 establishments in Arkansas
Populated places established in 1846